Wonju Stadium is a multi-purpose stadium in Wonju, South Korea. It is currently used mostly for football matches. The stadium has a capacity of 20,000 people and was opened in 1980.

External links
 Wonju Sports Facilities Management Center 

Sports venues in Gangwon Province, South Korea
Football venues in South Korea
Gangwon FC
Ulsan Hyundai FC
Multi-purpose stadiums in South Korea
Sports venues completed in 1980
K League 1 stadiums